The 2015 Chilean telethon (Spanish: Teletón 2015) is the 27th version of the solidarity campaign to be held in Chile, which sought to raise funds for the rehabilitation of children with motor disabilities. Its slogan was La hacemos todos (We do it all). It was held from the Teatro Teletón from 22:00 on Friday, 27 November until 21:00 on Saturday November 28  and from Julio Martínez National Stadium from 22:00 in its final stretch. The event ended fulfilling the goal with a final count of CLP30,601,978,621.

Release 

The official release of the campaign was 1 October at the Teatro Teletón, where it presented the anthem of the campaign, including the slogan Teletón, We do it all (Teletón, la hacemos todos), played by Mario Guerrero, Consuelo Schuster, Tommy Rey, Américo, Shamanes, Zaturno, Naykon, Karnasa, Joe Vasconcellos and Natalino.

Broadcasting 

The transmission of the event held jointly by all television channels grouped in the National Association of Television of Chile (ANALTEL):

 Telecanal
 La Red
 UCV Television
 TVN/TV Chile (international)
 Mega
 Chilevisión
 Canal 13 (Chile)/13i (international)

Radios 

 ADN Radio Chile
 Radioactiva
 Radio Agricultura
 Radio Bio-Bio
 Radio Carolina
 Radio Cooperativa
 Radio Disney
 Play FM
 Radio Pudahuel
 Tele13 Radio
 Radio Digital FM
 Radio Positiva FM
 Radio Portales

Hosts 

 Mario Kreutzberger (Don Francisco)
 Rafael Araneda
 Cecilia Bolocco
 Diana Bolocco
 Martín Cárcamo
 Carolina de Moras
 Karen Doggenweiler
 Julián Elfenbein
 Ignacio Franzani
 Luis Jara
 Kike Morandé
 Katherine Salosny
 Tonka Tomicic
 Juan Carlos Valdivia
 Julia Vial
 José Miguel Viñuela
 Antonio Vodanovic
 Andrés Caniulef
 Jean Philippe Cretton
 María Luisa Godoy
 Eva Gómez
 Amaro Gómez-Pablos
 Goferk (Youtuber)

Guest artists 

 Miguel Bosé
 Diego Torres
 Yuri
 Axel
 Luis Fonsi
 Osmani García
 Noche de Brujas
 Américo
 Carlos Vives
 Stefan Kramer
 Power Peralta
 Los Atletas de la Risa
 Francisca Valenzuela
 Sofía Reyes

Sponsors 

 Banco de Chile
 Babysec
 Confort
 LadySoft
 Superior
 Belmont
 Bilz y Pap
 Cachantún
 Cerveza Cristal
 Watt's
 Cannes
 Claro
 Colún
 Copec
 Daily Gotas
 LAN Airlines
 Lucchetti
 Omo
 Ripley
 Sodimac
 Soprole
 Tapsin
 Té Supremo

Controversy
On October 28, the National Economic Prosecutor denounced Empresas CMPC of having colluded with competitor SCA to allocate market shares and fixing prices for the sale of products from the category of tissue paper, which quickly became known as the Confort Cartel (toilet paper being known as confort in Chile). For this reason, this company decided to suspend the advertising of these three brands associated with the campaign; while representatives of the foundation said that CMPC will maintain its contribution, but avoid any public display to prevent harm to the Telethon, given the prestige that the collusion case has caused to its corporate image.

References

External links 
 Fundación Teletón
 Asociación Nacional de Televisión de Chile
 Oritel

Telethon
Chilean telethons